Gemeprost (16, 16-dimethyl-trans-delta2 PGE1 methyl ester) is an analogue of prostaglandin E1.

Clinical use

It is used as a treatment for obstetric bleeding.

It is used with mifepristone to terminate pregnancy up to 24 weeks gestation.

Side effects

Vaginal bleeding, cramps, nausea, vomiting, loose stools or diarrhea, headache, muscle weakness; dizziness; flushing; chills; backache; dyspnoea; chest pain; palpitations and mild pyrexia. Rare: Uterine rupture, severe hypotension, coronary spasms with subsequent myocardial infarctions.

References

External links 
 

Abortifacients
Prostaglandins
Sanofi